Musino (Musa) is a rural locality (a village) in Bazlyksky Selsoviet, Bizhbulyaksky District, Bashkortostan, Russia. The population was 91 as of 2010. There is 1 street.

Geography 
Musino is located 15 km northeast of Bizhbulyak (the district's administrative centre) by road. Yegorovka is the nearest rural locality.

References 

Rural localities in Bizhbulyaksky District